Geno Valkov Dobrevski (born 12 May 1970) is a former Bulgarian footballer who played as a forward.

Career
Dobrevski played for most of his career with Botev Plovdiv, earning championship bronze medals with the team in 1993 and 1994. During the autumn of 1995, he was part of the Slavia Sofia team, which won the A PFG at the end of the season. In 1998, Dobrevski had a short spell in Portugal with Paços de Ferreira.

Dobrevski has a twin brother, Ivan Dobrevski, who also plied his trade as a footballer. Following their retirement, the two brothers have become involved in business, representing the Portuguese brand Murati. They own shoe stores in Sofia, Plovdiv and Varna.

References

External links
Player Profile at ForaDeJogo.net

1970 births
Living people
Association football forwards
Bulgarian footballers
Footballers from Plovdiv
Botev Plovdiv players
PFC Slavia Sofia players
First Professional Football League (Bulgaria) players
Bulgaria international footballers
F.C. Paços de Ferreira players
Expatriate footballers in Portugal
Bulgarian expatriate sportspeople in Portugal
Bulgarian expatriate footballers
Twin sportspeople
Bulgarian twins